Article 6 of the European Convention on Human Rights is a provision of the European Convention which protects the right to a fair trial. In criminal law cases and cases to determine civil rights it protects the right to a public hearing before an independent and impartial tribunal within reasonable time, the presumption of innocence, right to silence and other minimum rights for those charged in a criminal case (adequate time and facilities to prepare their defence, access to legal representation, right to examine witnesses against them or have them examined, right to the free assistance of an interpreter).

Text
Article 6 reads as follows.

Nature
The majority of Convention violations that the Court finds today are excessive delays, in violation of the "reasonable time" requirement, in civil and criminal proceedings before national courts, mostly in Italy and France. Under the "independent tribunal" requirement, the Court has ruled that military judges in Turkish state security courts are incompatible with Article 6.

Another significant set of violations concerns the "confrontation clause" of Article 6 (i.e. the right to examine witnesses or have them examined). In this respect, problems of compliance with Article 6 may arise when national laws allow the use in evidence of the testimonies of absent, anonymous and vulnerable witnesses.

Cases
 Colozza v Italy (1985) – "When domestic law permits a trial to be held notwithstanding the absence of a person 'charged with a criminal offence' who is in Mr. Colozza's position, that person should, once he becomes aware of the proceedings, be able to obtain, from a court which has heard him, a fresh determination of the merits of the charge." (see also: Trial in absentia § Europe)
 Heaney and McGuinness v. Ireland (2000) – Case involving two Irish citizens imprisoned for choosing to remain silent and to use their rights not to incriminate themselves when suspected of an IRA-related terrorist act. "The Court ... finds that the security and public order concerns relied on by the Government cannot justify a provision which extinguishes the very essence of the applicants' rights to silence and against self-incrimination guaranteed by Article 6 § 1 of the Convention."
 García Ruiz v Spain (1999) – The Court applied the fourth-instance doctrine, stating that it is not its function to deal with errors of fact or law allegedly committed by a national court unless and in so far as they may have infringed rights and freedoms protected by the Convention.
 Van Kück v Germany (2003) – the court took the approach of considering the merits of the case and in finding a breach based on the fact that the German courts had failed to follow the Strasbourg court's approach to medical necessity on hormone replacement therapy and gender reassignment surgery. This was in line with and an expansion of the earlier ruling in Camilleri v Malta (2000) in which the courts were more willing to consider the merits of the court's decision which compromised fairness, stating that the decision had been "arbitrary or manifestly unreasonable".
 Perez v France (2004) – "the right to a fair trial holds so prominent a place in a democratic society that there can be no justification for interpreting Article 6 § 1 of the Convention restrictively"
 Khamidov v Russia (2007) – the court considered "abundant evidence" contradicting the finding of the national court, with the result that "the unreasonableness of this conclusion is so striking and palpable on the face of it" that the decision was "grossly arbitrary". This once again showed the court's changing stance in considering the actual merits of a case. This therefore illustrates the court is developing an appellate function as opposed to a review function.
 Khlyustov v. Russia (2013) - A person may not claim a violation of fair trial when he has been acquitted or when proceedings have been discontinued. 
 Guðmundur Andri Ástráðsson v. Iceland (2020) — irregular appointment of judges breached the right to tribunal established by law
 Xero Flor v. Poland (2021) — irregular appointment of judges breached the right to tribunal established by law
The Convention applies to contracting parties only; however, in cases where a contracting party court has to confirm the ruling of a non-contracting state, they retain a duty to act within the confines of article 6. Such was the case in Pellegrini v Italy (2001), a case concerning the application of a Vatican ecclesiastical court ruling on a divorce case.

In the determination of criminal charges, Engel v Netherlands set out three criteria to determine meaning of "criminal": a) the classification of the offense in the law of the respondent state, b) the nature of the offence, c) the possible punishment.
Funke v France states that if the contracting state classifies the act as criminal, then it is automatically so for the purposes of article 6.

 John Murray v United Kingdom (1996) 22 EHRR 29
 Benthem v Netherlands (ECtHR October 23, 1985)
 Assanidze v. Georgia, App. No. 71503/01 (Eur. Ct. H.R. Apr. 8, 2004)

See also
European Convention on Human Rights
Human Rights Act 1998
Speedy trial

References

Literature
 D. Vitkauskas, G. Dikov Protecting the Right to a Fair Trial under the European Convention on Human Rights. A Handbook for Legal Practitioners. 2nd Edition, prepared by Dovydas Vitkauskas Strasbourg, Council of Europe, 2017
 D. Vitkauskas, G. Dikov Protecting the Right to a Fair Trial under the European Convention on Human Rights. Council of Europe Human Rights Handbooks Strasbourg, Council of Europe, 2012
 N. Mole, C. Harby The right to a fair trial. A guide to the implementation of Article 6 of the European Convention on Human Rights Strasbourg, Council of Europe, 2006
 R. Goss  Criminal Fair Trial Rights: Article 6 of the European Convention on Human Rights  Portland/Oxford: Hart, 2014

 
6